Salimpur is a village located at Patna District in Bihar, India. Its distance from the State Capital is approximately 40 kilometres. One can reach Salimpur by Train and Bus via National Highway 31 . The population according to the census of 2011 is 3,223.

References

Villages in Patna district